Mickaël Ménétrier (born 23 August 1978 in Reims) is a French professional football goalkeeper who currently plays for Luxembourg National Division side F91 Dudelange.

References
 
 

1978 births
Living people
French footballers
French expatriate footballers
Expatriate footballers in England
Expatriate footballers in Belgium
Ligue 2 players
AFC Bournemouth players
US Boulogne players
AS Cherbourg Football players
FC Istres players
R.E. Virton players
F91 Dudelange players
English Football League players
Sportspeople from Reims
Association football goalkeepers
Footballers from Grand Est
Expatriate footballers in Luxembourg
French expatriate sportspeople in England
French expatriate sportspeople in Luxembourg
French expatriate sportspeople in Belgium